Platycorynus limbatus is a species of leaf beetle from Gabon and the Democratic Republic of the Congo. It was first described by Joseph Sugar Baly in 1881.

Subspecies
There are two subspecies of P. limbatus:

 Platycorynus limbatus congoensis (Burgeon, 1940)
 Platycorynus limbatus limbatus (Baly, 1881): The nominotypical subspecies.

References

Eumolpinae
Beetles of the Democratic Republic of the Congo
Taxa named by Joseph Sugar Baly
Insects of Gabon